Outré is the debut solo album of Jeff Schmidt.

Track listing

2007 debut albums